Wolfgang Schwenke (born 27 March 1968) is a German former handball player. He competed in the men's tournament at the 1992 Summer Olympics.

References

External links
 

1968 births
Living people
German male handball players
Olympic handball players of Germany
Handball players at the 1992 Summer Olympics
People from Flensburg
Sportspeople from Schleswig-Holstein